Robert B. Lees (9 July 1922 – 6 December 1996) was an American linguist.

Education
Lees went to the Massachusetts Institute of Technology in 1956 to work on its machine translation project. He first came to notice with an influential review of Noam Chomsky's Syntactic Structures (1957) and with his 1960 book The Grammar of English Nominalizations. Lees was later dismissed from his research position by Victor Yngve, as Lees had wanted to continue working on straight linguistics rather than on machine translation. He then enrolled in the electrical engineering department at MIT, from which he obtained his Ph.D. in linguistics under Chomsky.

Career
Lees was the first Head of the Department of Linguistics at the University of Illinois Urbana-Champaign, serving from 1965 to 1968. In 1969, Lees moved to Israel to teach at Tel Aviv University, and he established the university's linguistics department in 1970.

Lees also went to India on a tour under the patronization of the Ford Foundation. He taught intensive courses on contemporary linguistics at Delhi University and at the Central Institute of English and Foreign Languages in Hyderabad.

Lees was known as a fierce partisan of Chomsky's brand of linguistics and could be withering in his criticism. A famous example is his response when informed that Nelson Francis had received a grant to produce the Brown Corpus: "That is a complete waste of your time and the government's money.  You are a native speaker of English; in ten minutes you can produce more illustrations of any point in English grammar than you will find in many millions of words of random text."

Selected works
The Phonology of Modern Standard Turkish. Routledge Curzan.  
English for Turks. Spoken Language Serv 1981, 
with Braj B. Kachru, Yacov Malkiel, Angelina Pietrangeli: Issues in Linguistics: Papers in Honor of Henry and Renee Kahane. University of Illinois Press 1974, 
The Grammar of English Nominalizations
The Basis of Glottochronology. Language, 29 (1953)

For a bibliography of Lees's publications, see Sadock and Vanek 1970.

Bibliography
 Biber, D., and E. Finegan.  1991.  "On the exploitation of computerized corpora in variation studies."  In K. Aijmer and B. Altenberg (eds.), English corpus linguistics: Studies in honour of Jan Svartvik, 204-220.  London: Longman.

See also
Glottochronology

References

External links

In Memoriam Robert B. Lees (linguist mailing list)
Robert B. Lees: In Memoriam: Noam Chomsky, Kenneth Hale, Braj Kachru, Frederick Newmeyer, Arnold Zwicky and others remember Robert Lees.

1922 births
1996 deaths
Linguists from the United States
20th-century linguists
Massachusetts Institute of Technology people
University of Illinois faculty
American expatriates in India
American expatriates in Israel